KKID is a radio station airing a classic rock format licensed to Salem, Missouri, broadcasting on 92.9 MHz FM. The station is owned by Steven and Jill Wheeler.

References

External links

Classic rock radio stations in the United States
KID